The 2010 SEC Championship Game was played on December 4, 2010, in the Georgia Dome in Atlanta, Georgia, to determine the 2010 football champion of the Southeastern Conference (SEC). The game featured the Auburn Tigers, the champion of the West Division, and the South Carolina Gamecocks, champion of the East Division. South Carolina was the designated "home team". The SEC East is 11–8 in SEC Championship games, with the Florida Gators accounting for seven of the 11 victories.

Auburn defeated South Carolina 35–27 in Auburn during the regular season.

The game began at 4:00 p.m. EST and was televised by CBS Sports, for the tenth straight season. It featured Auburn's Heisman trophy contending quarterback Cam Newton against South Carolina's Stephen Garcia; running backs Marcus Lattimore (South Carolina) and Mike Dyer (Auburn); and receivers Alshon Jeffery (South Carolina) and Darvin Adams (Auburn). Gene Chizik and Steve Spurrier were the coaches of the teams.

See also
2010 Southeastern Conference football season

Notes
The No. 1 ranked BCS team had lost its conference championship game three seasons in a row and Auburn ended the streak this year. Auburn broke the SEC Championship Game records for most offensive yards, most points scored and largest margin of victory. Auburn receiver Darvin Adams set the game record for most receiving yards with 217. Auburn quarterback Cam Newton matched the game record for touchdown responsibility with six, four throwing and two running.

References

Championship
SEC Championship Game
Auburn Tigers football games
South Carolina Gamecocks football games
SEC Championship Game
SEC Championship Game
SEC Championship Game